Ralfs Nemiro (born 9 February 1981 in Riga) is a Latvian politician. Nemiro is the former Economics Minister of Latvia. He stepped down from the role after his security clearance to access state secrets was revoked.

References

Living people
1981 births
Ministers of Economics of Latvia
Politicians from Riga